The Travels of Jaimie McPheeters is an American Western television series based on Robert Lewis Taylor's 1958 Pulitzer Prize-winning novel of the  same name, and starring Kurt Russell, Dan O'Herlihy and (in the final 13 episodes) Charles Bronson. The series aired on ABC for one season, 1963–64, and was produced by MGM Television.

Synopsis
The series was aimed at teenaged boys and young families. It was known for the breakthrough performances of the 12-year-old Kurt Russell in the title role and Charles Bronson as Linc Murdock, the second wagon master in the last 13 episodes. Bronson began his role in the episode "The Day of the Toll Takers" (January 5, 1964). Each episode begins with the title "The Day of ..."

Although it started out with an ensemble cast, by the end of the run, the cast had largely been reduced to the characters of Jaimie and Linc. The original cast included Dan O'Herlihy in the role of Jaimie's father, Sardius "Doc" McPheeters, who often yields to alcohol and gambling. Donna Anderson played Jenny, a young pioneer woman who befriends Jaimie during the perilous journey westward.

Mark Allen was cast in 19 episodes as Matt Kissel, with Meg Wyllie in 18 segments as Mrs. Kissel. In nine episodes, real-life child barbershop quartet The Osmond Brothers portrayed the singing sons of the Kissel family, all with given names of books of the Old Testament, Alan Osmond as Micah Kissel, Merrill Osmond as Deuteronomy Kissel, Jay Osmond as Lamentations Kissel, and Wayne Osmond as Leviticus Kissel.

Michael Witney in 14 episodes portrayed the first wagon master, Buck Coulter, with his last appearance in "The Day of the Pawnees, Part 2" (December 29, 1963). Witney was replaced by Bronson in the next episode. Hedley Mattingly was cast eight times as Coe, and James Westerfield appeared seven times as John Murrel. Other recurring roles were filled by Sandy Kenyon in five episodes as Shep Baggott, stuntman Paul Baxley four times as Tracey, and Mike DeAnda in five assorted roles. Vernett Allen, III, was cast as Othello in nine episodes.

Guthrie Thomas, the now-veteran singer-songwriter, was also included in the cast of character actors as a "double" for Kurt Russell when horses were involved. Thomas and Russell were only months apart in age and the TV producers did not want Russell harmed because of insurance liabilities. Thomas had been raised on several ranches, one of which was owned by  film actor Francis Lederer, and fulfilled the age and horse-riding requirements of Russell's role as Jaimie McPheeters. Thomas was accustomed to the film business, as several motion pictures, one being John Ford's Sergeant Rutledge, had been filmed at Lederer's Mission Stables, now an historical California landmark. Veteran Western actor Slim Pickens, a close friend of Thomas' family, was responsible for his getting a screen test and subsequent roles.

Episodes

Guest stars

 Ed Ames
 Dehl Berti
 James Brown
 Barry Cahill
 Howard Caine
 Lloyd Corrigan
 Royal Dano
 Leif Erickson
 Carl Esmond
 Kathy Garver
 Mariette Hartley
 George Kennedy
 Martin Landau
 Ruta Lee
 David McCallum
 Burgess Meredith
 Barbara Nichols
 Susan Oliver
 Slim Pickens
 Roy Roberts
 Chris Robinson
 Albert Salmi
 Frank Silvera
 Lee Van Cleef
 Doodles Weaver
 Keenan Wynn

Reception
The program faced stiff competition on CBS at 7:30 Eastern on Sundays from My Favorite Martian and the first half of The Ed Sullivan Show. NBC aired Walt Disney's Wonderful World of Color in the same time slot.

Film
After the series was cancelled, Kurt Russell and Charles Bronson reprised their roles of Jaimie McPheeters and Linc Murdock in the 1964 theatrical movie called Guns of Diablo, an expanded color version of the series' final episode, "The Day of the Reckoning" (March 15, 1964). Russ Conway appeared in the film as "Doc" McPheeters, replacing Dan O'Herlihy in new sequences.

References

External links

 
 The Travels of Jaimie McPheeters at CTVA

1960s American drama television series
1960s Western (genre) television series
1963 American television series debuts
1964 American television series endings
American Broadcasting Company original programming
Black-and-white American television shows
English-language television shows
Television series by MGM Television
Television shows based on American novels